Izaskun Aramburu Balda (born December 29, 1975) is a Spanish sprint canoer who has competed from the mid-1990s to the early 2000s (decade). She won six medals at the ICF Canoe Sprint World Championships with two golds (K-2 200 m: 1999, 2001), and four bronzes (K-2 200 m: 1998, K-2 500 m: 1997;, K-4 500 m: 1997, 1998).

Aramburu also competed in two Summer Olympics, earning her best finish of sixth on two occasions (K-2 500 m and K-4 500 m: both 1996).

References
 
 
 

1975 births
Canoeists at the 1996 Summer Olympics
Canoeists at the 2000 Summer Olympics
Living people
Olympic canoeists of Spain
Spanish female canoeists
ICF Canoe Sprint World Championships medalists in kayak
20th-century Spanish women